Rivka Bertisch Meir was an American psychologist, licensed mental health counselor and psychotherapist. She is known for the creation of personal development programs in the United States, Israel, and Argentina in the 1970s and 1980s and for establishing global partnerships in international psychology.

Meir was a chairperson and International Liaison of International Psychology (Division 52) of the American Psychological Association from 2005 to 2012. As International Liaison, she recruited international psychologists to establish partnerships with the American Psychological Association. Meir was founder of the APA "Adopt a Psychologist" initiative which established international alliances between psychologists. Meir was co-founder of the APA National Speakers Network.

Background and education
Rivka Bertisch was born in Argentina to European Jewish parents. Most of her relatives were killed by the Nazis in Poland during World War II.  She attended the University of Hawaii where she received dual bachelor's degrees in Communications and Psychology and a Masters in Public Health.  Meir pursued and completed all but one graduate level course at the University of Hawaii before receiving a PhD from the University for Humanistic Studies (presently Alliant International University). Her dissertation work used cell memory techniques to access and modify traumatic memories.

In the 1970s, Meir was a program planner and researcher at the School of Community Medicine of the Hadassah Medical Center at Hebrew University in Jerusalem, Israel, and then at the Jerusalem Municipality, Department of Public Health where Rivka (as Rivka Danziger) co-directed Project KIDUM. Meir also introduced and directed "EST" (Erhard Seminar Training—Landmark Education) to Israel from 1977 to 1979. In 1986, she moved back to Argentina, where she, sponsored by the R. Bertisch Foundation from 1990 to 1996, pioneered the Integrative Rivka's Method, which was aimed at improving relationship skills in patients. This approach to therapy emphasizes body-mind connection, holistic health promotion, and various spiritual and psychological techniques, including firewalking.

In 1996, she moved to the New York City area where she became an organizational consultant.

In 2004, Meir founded the APA "Adopt a Psychologist" initiative, a mentoring program to foster alliances between psychologists worldwide.

Academic positions
 2005–2012 – Visiting professor of Health Sciences, TCI College of Technology, New York
 2011 – Visiting professor of psychology, Ariel University, Samaria, Israel
 2011 – Visiting professor of Social Work, Tel Aviv University, Israel
 2011 – Visiting professor of Public Health, Ben Gurion University, Beersheva, Israel
 2011 – Visiting professor of Social Work, Hebrew University, Jerusalem, Israel
 2008–2009 – Adjunct Professor of Social Work, Fordham University, New York
 2007–2009 – Adjunct Professor of Psychology, Lehman College, CUNY, New York<
 2007 – Adjunct Professor of Psychology, Pace University, New York
 2005–2007 – Adjunct Professor of Psychology, Hunter College, CUNY, New York
 2005–2006 – Adjunct Professor of Social Science, BMCC – CUNY, New York
 2006 – Adjunct Professor of Psychology, Fordham University, New York
 2003 – Visiting professor of psychology, Complutense University, Madrid, Spain
 1998–2001 – Adjunct Professor of Psychology and Health Sciences, Touro College, New York
 1992 – Professor in the School of Medicine, University of Buenos Aires, Argentina
 1977–1980 Visiting professor in the Schools of Social Work, Educational Psychology, and Occupational Therapy, Hebrew University, Jerusalem, Israel
 1976–1977 Researcher and Program Planner, Hadassah Medical Center, Hebrew University, Jerusalem, Israel
 1976 – Instructor of Psychology, Leeward Community College, Honolulu, Hawaii
 1974–1976 Adjunct Instructor of Psychology, University of Hawaii, Honolulu, Hawaii

References

Year of birth missing
2014 deaths
American women psychologists
American psychotherapists
University of Hawaiʻi alumni
Saybrook University alumni
Academic staff of Ariel University
American women academics
21st-century American women